The House of Flanders, also called the Baldwins, was a medieval ruling family that was founded by Baldwin Iron Arm, son-in-law of Charles the Bald.

From 1051, the House of Flanders also reigned over the County of Hainaut, with Baldwin I of Hainaut. In  1119, on the death of Baldwin VII, the family had a series of setbacks, but in 1191, the family recovered the title of Count of Flanders with Baldwin VIII (Baldwin V of Hainaut). 

The dynasty established the Latin Empire of Constantinople during the Fourth Crusade, and it also briefly ruled the County of Namur (1188–1212). The House of Flanders became extinct in 1280 with the death of Margaret II.

A cadet branch, the House of Boulogne, ruled over the County of Boulogne. Members of this house joined the First Crusade, established the Kingdom of Jerusalem, and produced its first kings.

Genealogy 

 Baldwin Iron Arm, Count of Flanders († 879)
   Baldwin II the Bald, Count of Flanders († 918)
 Arnulf I the Great, Count of Flanders († 965)
 Elftrude, born circa 932, married in 964 to  Siegfried, Count of Guînes († 965)
 Hildegarde (934 † 990), married in 943 to  Dirk II, Count of Holland (930 † 988)
 Egbert (937 † 953)
 Liutgarde (938 † 964), married in 950 to Wichmann IV, Count of Hamaland and Ghent.
    Baldwin III, Count of Flanders († 962)
    Arnulf II, Count of Flanders († 988)
 Mathilda († 995 or before)
    Baldwin IV the Bearded (v.980 † 1035), Count of Flanders († 1035)
  Baldwin V of Lille, Count of Flanders († 1067)
   Baldwin VI the Good, (1030 - 1070), Count of Flanders and of Hainaut
   Arnulf III of Flanders (1055 † 1071), Count of Flanders and Hainaut
    Baldwin II of Hainaut (1056 † 1098), Count of Hainaut
    Baldwin III of Hainaut (1088 † 1120), Count of Hainaut
    Baldwin IV the Builder (1108 † 1171), Count of Hainaut
 Agnes of Hainaut, married  Ralph I, Lord of Coucy
    Baldwin V of Hainaut (1150 † 1195), Count of Hainaut
 Isabella of Hainault (°1170- †1190), married  Philip II of France 
    Baldwin VI of Hainaut (°1171- †1205), Count of Flanders and Hainaut, Latin Emperor of Constantinople
   Joan (1199-1200 † 1244), Countess  of Flanders and of Hainaut
      Margaret II (ca.1202 † 1280), Countess  of Flanders and of Hainaut
 Yolanda (°1175- †1219), married  Peter II of Courtenay, Latin Emperor of Constantinople
  Philip the Noble, Marquis of Namur (°1175- †1212) 
  Henry (°1176- †1216), Latin Emperor of Constantinople
 Sybille (°1179- †1217), married to  Guichard IV, Sire of Beaujeu
    Eustace (†1217), regent of the Kingdom of Thessalonica
 Matilda (1032 - 1083), married in 1053 to  William the Conqueror
    Robert the Frisian, (1033 - 1093), Count of Flanders from 1071 to 1093
  Robert II, Count of Flanders from 1093 to 1111
  Baldwin VII (1093-1119), Count of Flanders
 Guillaume (1094-1109)
   Philip (1095-) (died young)
 Adela of Flanders († 1115), married firstly  Canute IV of Denmark. Married secondly  Roger Borsa, Duke of Apulia.
    Charles I, Count of Flanders (1084 – 1127)
 Gertrude (1080 - † 1117), married to Henry III († 1095) Count of Louvain and Brussels, then in 1096 to Theodoric II, Duke of Lorraine († 1115).
 Philip of Loo, whose illegitimate son William of Ypres was a claimant to the county of Flanders.
   Ogive, abbess of Mesen.
   Judith of Flanders, Countess of Northumbria (1037 † 1094), married in 1058 to Tostig Godwinson († 1066), Earl of Northumbria, then in 1071 to Welf I, Duke of Bavaria († 1101)
    Adelolf († 933), Count of Boulogne 
   Arnulf II († 971), Count of Boulogne
  Arnulf III († 990), Count of Boulogne
 Baldwin II († 1025), Count of Boulogne 
  Eustace I (v. 995 † 1049), Count of Boulogne
  Eustace II († 1087), Count of Boulogne
  Eustace III, Count of Boulogne (1056 † 1125)
 Matilda I, Countess of Boulogne (1105 † 1152), married in 1125 to Stephen of England
 Godfrey of Bouillon (1058 † 1099), Duke of Lower Lorraine, a leader of the First Crusade and "Advocate of the Holy Sepulchre"
   Baldwin I of Jerusalem (1065 † 1118), accompanied his brother to the Holy Land, became Count of Edessa and then King of Jerusalem
 Godfrey († 1095), Bishop of Paris
 Lambert II, Count of Lens († 1054)
  Gerberge († 1049), married Frederick, Duke of Lower Lorraine (1003 † 1065)
 Arnulf IV, Count of Ternois

Arms

References

 
Flanders